

Wolfgang  Pickert (3 February 1897 – 19 July 1984) was a general in the Luftwaffe of Nazi Germany during World War II who commanded the III Flak Corps. He was a recipient of the Knight's Cross of the Iron Cross with Oak Leaves.

In January 1943, Pickert, as commander of the 9th Flak Division, flew out of the Stalingrad encirclement avoiding capture.

Awards and decorations
 Iron Cross (1914) 2nd Class (2 November 1916) & 1st Class (13 April 1918)
 Honour Cross of the World War 1914/1918
 Clasp to the Iron Cross (1939) 2nd Class (1939) & 1st Class (1940)
 Anti-Aircraft Flak Battle Badge (19 August 1942)
 German Cross in Gold on 7 December 1942 as Generalmajor in the 9. Flak-Division
 Knight's Cross of the Iron Cross with Oak Leaves
 Knight's Cross on 11 January 1943 as Generalmajor and commander of 9. Flak-Division (mot.)
 489th Oak Leaves on 5 June 1944 as Generalmajor and commander of III. Flak-Korps

References

Citations

Bibliography

 
 
 
 

1897 births
1984 deaths
Military personnel from Poznań
People from the Province of Posen
Luftwaffe World War II generals
German Army personnel of World War I
Prussian Army personnel
Recipients of the clasp to the Iron Cross, 1st class
Recipients of the Gold German Cross
Recipients of the Knight's Cross of the Iron Cross with Oak Leaves
German prisoners of war in World War II held by the United States
German prisoners of war in World War II held by the United Kingdom
German commanders at the Battle of Stalingrad
Reichswehr personnel
Generals of Anti-aircraft Artillery